Kunwar Pradyuman Singh Lodhi is an Indian politician. He is a member and head of royal House of Hindoria and descendant of Raja Kishore Singh Lodhi of Hindoria who rebelled against Britishers in 1857. He was elected to the Madhya Pradesh Legislative Assembly from Malhara. He was an elected member of the Madhya Pradesh Legislative Assembly as a member of the Indian National Congress. He left the Indian National Congress in July 2020 and on the same day, he joined Bharatiya Janata Party.

References

Madhya Pradesh MLAs 2018–2023
Bharatiya Janata Party politicians from Madhya Pradesh
Living people
People from Chhatarpur district
Indian National Congress politicians from Madhya Pradesh
Year of birth missing (living people)